KNZR (1560 kHz) is a commercial AM radio station in Bakersfield, California.  It is owned by Alpha Media and airs a talk radio format, which is simulcast on sister station 97.7 KNZR-FM.  The studios and offices are on Pegasus Drive in Bakersfield.

KNZR broadcasts with 25,000 watts of power by day and 10,000 watts at night, using a three-tower array directional antenna after sunset.  KNZR is designated by the Federal Communications Commission (FCC) as a clear channel, Class A radio station.  At night, with a good radio, it can be picked up around many parts of California and other Western states.  It shares Class A status on AM 1560 with WFME in New York City.  The transmitter is on Artimus Court in Bakersfield.

Programming
The schedule on KNZR-AM-FM is mostly syndicated conservative talk shows.  Weekdays begin with The Glenn Beck Program followed by The Rush Limbaugh Show, The Sean Hannity Show, The Mark Levin Show, Coast to Coast AM with George Noory and The Hugh Hewitt Show.  One local talk show is heard each weekday from 3 to 6 p.m., hosted by former Bakersfield City Council member and restaurateur Terry Maxwell.

On weekends, syndicated shows include Handel On The Law with Bill Handel, Somewhere in Time with Art Bell and The Tech Guy with Leo Laporte.  Most hours begin with world and national news from Fox News Radio.

History

KPMC
The station signed on the air in 1933.  It began as experimental station W6XAI on 1550 kilocycles.  It later got its commercial license as KPMC, named after its owner, the Pioneer Mercantile Company, and was powered at 1,000 watts.  It was the second station on the air in Bakersfield, after KERN which got its license the previous year.  After the enactment of the North American Regional Broadcasting Agreement (NARBA), KPMC moved up the dial to 1560 kHz.

KPMC was an ABC Radio Network affiliate in the 1940s and early 50s, carrying its schedule of dramas, comedies, news and sports.  In the 1950s, KPMC was given Class I-B status by the Federal Communications Commission, allowing it to increase its power to 10,000 watts.  As network programming moved from radio to television in the 1950s, KPMC switched to a full service middle of the road format of popular music, news, talk and sports.

KNZR
In the 1980s, KPMC eliminated its music programming and went full-time as a talk radio station.  It was an affiliate of both CBS Radio and the Mutual Broadcasting System, used for their newsgathering of U.S. and world stories.

In January 1990, Buckley Broadcasting bought KPMC for $1 million.

Changes in Ownership
Buckley Broadcasting acquired Smooth Jazz station 97.7 KSMJ in 2001.  Buckley decided to pair 97.7 FM with AM 1560, to give Bakersfield listeners the choice to hear the talk programming on KNZR on either AM or FM.  KSMJ changed to its current KNZR-FM call sign on September 11, 2013.  The two stations began simulcasting around the clock.

Buckley switched the call sign to KNZR on September 21, 1990.  An FM simulcast on KNZR-FM began in November 2011.

In 2014, Buckley Broadcasting sold its California stations, including KNZR-AM-FM, to Alpha Media of Portland, Oregon.  Alpha Media Chairman Larry Wilson said, "The Buckley clusters in California will be a great addition to the West Coast footprint.  Bakersfield is a rich and vibrant city full of live and local opportunities."

Racial Controversy
On January 18, 2018, Midday host Jaz McKay was told that due to budgetary concerns he would be replaced the next week with Sean Hannity in the noon to 3pm slot which he had occupied for 14 years. McKay then took to social media and used derogatory language to describe Hispanic radio broadcasts in the area. McKay claimed the large number of Spanish language radio stations in Bakersfield made it increasingly difficult for English speaking announcers to find employment. At 45.5%, Hispanics comprise the largest demographic group in Bakersfield. On January 24, McKay's time slot was indeed taken over by the syndicated radio show from Sean Hannity. On the same day, it was also reported that McKay's fellow conservative talk show host Inga Barks was, for unspecified reasons, no longer associated with the station.

McKay was later hired for the 10:00 a.m. to 2:00 p.m. time slot on KERN 1180 AM & 96.1 FM, in December, 2018.  KERN 1180, KNZR's chief talk radio competitor, is owned by American General Media.

References

External links
FCC History Cards for KNZR

News and talk radio stations in the United States
NZR
Radio stations established in 1935
1935 establishments in California
Alpha Media radio stations
Clear-channel radio stations